The lesser blind mole-rat (Spalax leucodon) is a species of rodent in the family Spalacidae. It is found in Albania, Bosnia and Herzegovina, Bulgaria, Croatia, Greece, Hungary, Macedonia, Romania, Serbia, Montenegro, Turkey and Ukraine.

Prior to 2012, it was classified in the genus Spalax, but modern authors tend to separate this and some closely related mole rat species into a separate genus named Nannospalax. A cariological study showed that Nannospalax leucodon is a superspecies consisting of several cariologically distinct cryptic species.  According to this definition there are four separate cariological forms in the Carpathian Basin, one of them endangered and another one vulnerable while insufficient data are available to evaluate the conservation status of the other two forms. 

The lesser blind mole-rat was declared to be extinct in Croatia in 1984, having been present in the area of Srijem up until the 20th century, but its continued presence in Vučedol was confirmed in 2023.

One study directed towards life expectancy used this species by virtue of its incredible longevity performance, hypoxia and hypercapnia endurance, as well as cancer resistance. Looking at the fecal and skin samples of this ideal candidate, it was found that the Muribaculaceae bacterial family, known to be linked with longevity, dominated fecal samples.

References
 

 Musser, G. G. and M. D. Carleton. 2005. Superfamily Muroidea. pp. 894–1531 in Mammal Species of the World a Taxonomic and Geographic Reference. D. E. Wilson and D. M. Reeder eds. Johns Hopkins University Press, Baltimore.
 Németh A, Révay T, Hegyeli Z, Farkas J, Czabán D, Rózsás A, Csorba G 2009. Chromosomal forms and risk assessment of Nannospalax (superspecies leucodon) (Mammalia: Rodentia) in the Carpathian Basin Folia Zoologica, 58(3), 349–361.

Nannospalax
Mammals described in 1840
Taxa named by Alexander von Nordmann
Taxonomy articles created by Polbot